Kerala Mithram was the earliest Malayalam language newspaper published from Cochin, Kerala, India during 1881. It was printed in the beginning of the month as three, then one week later. Devji Bhimji, from Gujarat was the patron of the newspaper.  Kandathil Varghese Mappillai, the founder of Malayala Manorama, was editor-in-Chief and T.G. Paily was deputy editor.

References 

Defunct newspapers published in India
Malayalam-language newspapers
Publications established in 1881
Mass media in Kochi
1881 establishments in India
Defunct Malayalam-language newspapers